is a Japanese female idol group. Founded in 1984, the group was known for their color-coordinated outfits and use of acrobatics on stage.

History 
Saori Iwama, Noriko Hamada, Yukie Suzuki, and Yumiko Itaya were selected among 30,000 applicants by talent agency  to form the idol group that would become Saint Four. The quartet made their debut in the 1984 film The Audition, which cost 4 billion yen to produce. Saint Four's debut single  peaked at No. 35 on Oricon's singles chart and sold over 200,000 copies. Their second single  sold over 150,000 copies while their debut album The Audition sold over 300,000 copies. The quartet inspired Kazuhiko Shimamoto to create the character team  in his manga Blazing Transfer Student.

After the release of the group's third single  and third album  in September 1985, Nichigei Project sued Riv.Star Records for nonpayment of royalties. In September 1986, the Tokyo District Court ordered Riv.Star Records to pay Nichigei Project 388 million in compensation. Itaya left the group that year and was replaced by Jun Iwao.

On January 18, 1987, after two years and two months of activity, Saint Four performed their final concert at Maison Franco-Japonaise in Shibuya before disbanding.

Post-disbandment 
Following the disbandment of Saint Four, Iwama continued her career as an actress. Hamada and Suzuki formed the rock duo . The duo released two singles and one studio album before going their separate ways in 1989 and pursuing careers as actresses. After leaving Saint Four, Itaya released several nude gravure books and videos before getting married and leaving the entertainment industry for good. Iwao continued her career as an actress and anime voice actress under her real name Junko Iwao.

After interviewing Hamada and Suzuki, professional interviewer Gō Yoshida concluded that Saint Four was a scam, with the members paying a registration fee between 300,000 and 400,000, and they were not paid the monthly salary of 30,000.

On March 17, 2013, Iwama, Hamada, and Suzuki performed a reunion show at Kennedy House Ginza, marking their first show together in 26 years. While there were talks about a full Saint Four reunion, the TBS variety show  announced on April 10, 2015 that Itaya could not be contacted.

Reunion 
In 2018, Iwama, Hamada, and Suzuki reformed Saint Four as a trio and released two compilation albums on May 16.  consists of two new songs and nine self-covers while Complete Collection 1984–1986 compiles the group's classic songs. In addition, the trio performed their first reunion show at Kennedy House Ginza on June 17.

In August 2021, Saint Four announced the suspension of activities due to the COVID-19 pandemic.

Members

Current members 
  (born July 7, 1964) (1984–1987; 2018–present)
 Nickname: 
 Color: Green
  (born February 22, 1965) (1984–1987; 2018–present)
 Nickname: 
 Color: Pink
  (born May 15, 1966) (1984–1987; 2018–present)
 Nickname: 
 Color: Blue

Former members 
  (born March 5, 1968) (1984–1986)
 Nickname: 
 Color: Red
  (born February 18, 1970) (1986–1987)

Discography

Singles

Studio albums

Compilations

Filmography

Film 
  (November 17, 1984)
  (August 1987)

References

External links 
 
 
 
 Saint Four at Idol.ne.jp

1984 establishments in Japan
Japanese girl groups
Japanese idol groups
Japanese pop music groups
Musical groups established in 1984
Musical groups from Tokyo